Papilio zalmoxis, the giant blue swallowtail, is an African butterfly belonging to the family Papilionidae. The name of the species is given in honor of Zalmoxis – a divinity of the Getae (a people of the lower Danube), mentioned by Herodotus in his Histories IV, 93–96.

Description 
The colour of the upperside of the wings is usually blue but can be greenish, contrasting with the light-gray color of the underside of the wings. Previously thought to produce the blue colour by Tyndall scattering, the scales of Papilio zalmoxis are not nanostructured for incoherent scattering, instead the blue is a fluorescent pigmentary colour.

The uppersides of the forewings have narrow black stripes between black veins. The tip of the wings is black. Uppersides of the hindwings have a black marginal band, with a chain of blue spots. The body is bright yellow. Females are slightly smaller than males, and less brightly colored. The background colour of its wings is yellowish brown.

Distribution 
Papilio zalmoxis is an African butterfly, living in tropical areas (Liberia, Ghana, Cameroon, Nigeria, Gabon, Democratic Republic of the Congo, Zaire, Ivory Coast).

Gallery

References 

 Papilionidae – revised GloBIS/GART species checklist 
 Biolib
 Funet
 Eric Laithwaite, Allan Watson [and] Paul E. S. Whalley – The Dictionary of Butterflies and Moths in Colour – American consultant editor, W. Donald Duckworth

External links 
 Butterfly corner

zalmoxis
Butterflies of Africa
Butterflies described in 1864
Taxa named by William Chapman Hewitson